Pebbles, Volume 8 is a compilation album among the CDs in the Pebbles series; it is subtitled Southern California 1.  The next CD in the series, Pebbles, Volume 9 also feature bands from Southern California; while Highs in the Mid-Sixties, Volume 1, Highs in the Mid-Sixties, Volume 2, and Highs in the Mid-Sixties, Volume 3 showcase music from Los Angeles specifically.

Release data

This album was released on AIP Records in 1996 as #AIP-CD-5025.  Despite the similar catalogue number, there is no relation between the tracks on this CD and the tracks on the corresponding LP.

Notes on the tracks

The Dovers are highly regarded in the garage rock community; this is the A-side of their fourth single.  Other Dovers songs were included on the first two LPs in the Pebbles series.  "I Never Loved Her" by the Starfires is one of the most valuable garage rock singles.  The Hysterics' "Won't Get Far" is included on the Pebbles, Volume 9 CD.

Track listing

 Terry Randall: "S.O.S."
 The Gigolos: "She's My Baby"
 The Starfires: "I Never Loved Her"; Rel. 1965
 The Grains of Sand: "She Needs Me"; Rel. 1966
 The Humane Society: "Knock Knock (Who's There)"; Rel. 1967
 The Cindermen: "Don't Do It Some More ('Cause It Hurts So Good)"; Rel. 1966
 The Hysterics: "Everything's There"; Rel. 1965
 The Rumors: "Hold Me Now"; Rel. 1965
 The Colony: "All I Want"
 Byron and the Mortals: "Do You Believe Me"; Rel. 1966
 The Dirty Shames: "I Don't Care"; Rel. 1966
 Cloudwalkers: "Sunglasses"; Rel. 1965
 The Beckett Quintet: "No Correspondence"; Rel. 1965
 The Dovers: "She's Not Just Anybody"; Rel. 1966
 The Roosters: "One of These Days"; Rel. 1966
 The Avengers: "It's Hard to Hide"; Rel. 1966
 Sean and the Brandywines: "She Ain't No Good"; Rel. 1965
 The Rogues: "Wanted: Dead or Alive"; Rel. 1965
 The Last Word: "Sleepy Hollow"; Rel. 1966
 The Green Beans: "Don't Give Me No Friction"; Rel. 1965
 The Green Beans: "Who Needs You"; Rel. 1966
 The Bush: "Got Love If You Want It"; Rel. 1966
 Limey & the Yanks: "Guaranteed Love"; Rel. 1966
 Limey & the Yanks: "Out of Sight, out of Mind"; Rel. 1966
 The Caretakers of Deception: "X + Y = 13"

Pebbles (series) albums
1996 compilation albums